Paul Waggoner is an American politician and businessman serving as a member of the Kansas House of Representatives from the 104th district. Elected in 2018, he assumed office in 2019.

Education 
Waggoner earned a Bachelor of Science in business from the University of Kansas and a Master of Arts in history from Trinity International University.

Career 
Prior to entering politics, Waggoner owned and managed Waggoners, Inc., a cushioning and upholstery business based in Hutchinson, Kansas. Waggoner also served as a precinct committeeman of Medora Township, Reno County, Kansas. In the 2018 Republican primary for the 104th district in the Kansas House of Representatives Waggoner defeated incumbent Steven Becker by nine points. He then defeated Democratic nominee Garth Strand in the November general election. Waggoner defeated Strand again in the 2020 November general election.

References

External links
Vote Smart Paul Waggoner

Living people
University of Kansas alumni
Trinity International University alumni
People from Hutchinson, Kansas
People from Reno County, Kansas
Republican Party members of the Kansas House of Representatives
Businesspeople from Kansas
21st-century American politicians
Year of birth missing (living people)